
Gmina Czermin is a rural gmina (administrative district) in Pleszew County, Greater Poland Voivodeship, in west-central Poland.

Villages
Gmina Czermin contains the villages and settlements of Broniszewice, Czermin, Grab, Łęg, Mamoty, Pieruchy, Pieruszyce, Psienie-Ostrów, Skrzypna, Strzydzew, Wieczyn, Wola Duchowna, Żale, Żbiki and Żegocin.

Neighbouring gminas
Gmina Czermin is bordered by the gminas of Chocz, Gizałki, Kotlin, Pleszew and Żerków.

References
Polish official population figures 2006

Czermin
Gmina Czermin